Parmarion martensi is a species of air-breathing land semislug, a terrestrial pulmonate gastropod mollusk in the family Ariophantidae.

Distribution
The probable native distribution of Parmarion martensi includes Southeast Asia.

This species is already established in the USA, and is considered to represent a potentially serious threat as  a pest, an invasive species which could negatively affect agriculture, natural ecosystems, human health or commerce. Therefore it has been suggested that this species be given top national quarantine significance in the USA.

Parmarion martensi is considered to be a pest species in Hawaii.

Ecology
Parmarion martensi is a host for the nematode Angiostrongylus cantonensis, which causes rat lungworm disease.

Parmarion martensi feeds on lettuce and on papaya in gardens in Hawaii, and is considered to be a pest.

References

Further reading 
 Minato H. (1975). "A new record of Parmarion martensi from Ishigaki Island, the Southern Ryukyus, Japan". Venus 34(3-4): 109-111.
 Minato H. & Okubo K. (1991). "A record of Parmarion martensi Simroth, 1893 (Pulmonata: Helicarionidae) collected from Taiwan". The Chiribotan 22: 3-4.

External links
 Categorized Parmarion martensi information from the Hawaiian Ecosystems at Risk project (HEAR)

Ariophantidae
Gastropods described in 1893